The men's 1000 meter at the 2015 KNSB Dutch Single Distance Championships took place in Heerenveen at the Thialf ice skating rink on Sunday 2 November 2014. There were 24 participants.

Statistics

Result

Source:

<small>Referee: Jan Bolt  Starter: Wim van Biezen 
 Start: 13:26 hr. Finish: 13:57 hr.

Draw

References

Single Distance Championships
2015 Single Distance